The Capitol Rarities 1943-1950 is a 2009 compilation album of songs recorded by American singer Jo Stafford. It was released on March 24, 2009, on the DRG label and is a collection of rare recordings from the earlier part of her career.

Track listing

 Out of This World		 	
 Conversation While Dancing		 	
 Alone Together		 	
 Gee, It's Good to Hold You		 	
 You May Not Love Me		 	
 This Time		 	
 Promise		 	
 It's as Simple as That		 	
 Through a Thousand Dreams		 	
 Give Me Something to Dream About		 	
 It's Monday Every Day	 	
 It Was Written in the Stars		 	
 Jolly Jo		 	
 If I Ever Love Again		 	
 Open Door, Open Arms		 	
 Pagan Love Song		 	
 Our Very Own		 	
 Diamonds Are a Girl's Best Friend		 	
 Prisoner of Love's Song		 	
 This Is the Moment		 	
 The Stanley Steamer		 	
 Candy		 	
 Tell Me Why		 	
 White Christmas

References

2009 compilation albums
Jo Stafford compilation albums